Beáta Storczer (born 10 July 1969) is a Hungarian gymnast. She competed in six events at the 1988 Summer Olympics.

References

1969 births
Living people
Hungarian female artistic gymnasts
Olympic gymnasts of Hungary
Gymnasts at the 1988 Summer Olympics
Gymnasts from Budapest